The twelfth season of South Park, an American animated television series created by Trey Parker and Matt Stone, began airing on March 12, 2008. The twelfth season concluded after 14 episodes on November 19, 2008.
Saturday Night Live cast member Bill Hader is credited as a consultant starting with this season. Parker was the director and writer in this twelfth season. Stone was also the writer on the third episode of the twelfth season.

Overview
This season features a new title sequence, replacing the one used since the sixth season. It recreates the original to begin with before using clips from seasons four to eleven which the boys also sing their lines over. These older clips are replaced every half season with newer ones.

In the first half of the season, Mr. Kitty returns to prominence in "Major Boobage" for the first time since season three's "Cat Orgy", while Terrance and Phillip haven't featured prominently since season five's "Terrance and Phillip: Behind the Blow". Canada last featured prominently as a setting in season seven's "It's Christmas in Canada". Most notably in this season is Ms. Garrison's second sex change, returning her to being a man, as Mr. Garrison again. This is the last episode to date to explore Garrison's much examined sexuality. "Super Fun Time" indicates that following "The List", Stan and Wendy Testaburger are dating again.

The second half of the season begins with "The China Probrem", which marks the return of Steven Spielberg and George Lucas who are again portrayed as villains, despite seemingly dying in season six's "Free Hat". There is also the one two-part story: "Pandemic" and "Pandemic 2: The Startling". The following episode "About Last Night" parodies Barack Obama's victory in the 2008 presidential elections the night before. The episode was written and animated under the assumption Obama would win which turned out to be correct. Parker and Stone said it was considered intentionally redubbing the episode poorly if John McCain had won. This episode also revealed the political alliances of several citizens. "The Ungroundable" marks the return of the Goth Kids who last featured in season nine's "Erection Day".

Kenny McCormick does not die in this season.

Awards

The season received one Emmy Award and, in May 2009, a Webby Award.

Reception

Critical response
The twelfth season of South Park has been met with mostly positive reviews from critics and fans. Travis Fikett of IGN gave the season 7.5/10, saying that it was "good" and "Season 12 isn't bad, it's just not that great. There are a number of misfires and no truly classic episodes. That's a rarity for a series that often has fans calling up friends the next morning to say "Oh my God, did you see South Park?".

Episodes

Home media
South Park: The Complete Twelfth Season was released as a three-disc Region 1 DVD box set in the USA on March 10, 2009, nearly one year after it had begun broadcast on television.

References

External links

 South Park Studios - official website with streaming video of full episodes.
 The Comedy Network - full episodes for Canada

 
2008 American television seasons